The Goodyear 400 is a NASCAR Cup Series race held at Darlington Raceway in Darlington, South Carolina. A  race was held in May at the track in 1952, however the event did not become a regular one on the NASCAR schedule until 1957, as a  race in the Convertible Division, then known as the Rebel 300. In 1994, the race was relegated again to 400 miles. For a time, the race was held on or around Confederate Memorial Day, which is observed on May 10 in the state of South Carolina.

In 2005, as part of the settlement of the Ferko lawsuit and as part of a schedule realignment, Darlington was forced to give up one of its two races; the 400-mile race was dropped, with the fall Southern 500 taking its date before eventually moving back to its traditional Labor Day date in 2015.

In 2020, due to the COVID-19 pandemic, NASCAR announced it would be running two Darlington races in May (the fall Southern 500 date still stood), replacing the Chicagoland Speedway event and the Richmond Raceway spring race and also marking the return of spring Darlington racing. The track hosted a 400-mile race called The Real Heroes 400 on Sunday, May 17 (which was also the track's first scheduled day race since 2004) followed by a 500-kilometer race called the Toyota 500 on Wednesday, May 20.

On September 30, 2020, it was announced in a press conference at the South Carolina Governor's Mansion with Henry McMaster, Lesa Kennedy, and Darlington Raceway officials that after the success of the spring races in 2020, Darlington would receive a permanent second Cup date on the 2021 schedule and that it would be held on Mother's Day (May 9) in 2021 as part of a massive schedule realignment. The event would be a 400-miler just like The Real Heroes 400 in May 2020, and it would also become the throwback weekend for all three national series instead of the track's Labor Day weekend races. Goodyear, the official tire of NASCAR, would be the title sponsor for the spring Darlington race.

Notable races
1960: Johnny Allen goes up the race track and tears open the guardrail and then driving on the dirt banking on the outside of the track into a press grandstand. No one was seriously injured.
1970: Richard Petty hit the outside wall hard and then the inside wall even harder, causing his car to flip. The rag Petty would put in his mouth came out, and was mistaken by ABC as a gruesome death. Petty was seriously injured, but survived. During the roll, Petty's head hit the track surface several times, causing NASCAR to mandate the use of the Petty-developed window nets. These remain in use today.
1975: The finish shook into a bizarre sequence. In the final twenty laps Benny Parsons and David Pearson went after the lead; they raced side by side into Turn One and hammered the wall. Bobby Allison, who'd been a lap down, unlapped himself and raced into the lead with Darrell Waltrip and Donnie Allison hot on his heels. Bobby led them to the win, his second of the season and first at Darlington since 1972.
1977: A crash with five laps to go set up a wild finish. Darrell Waltrip shot past Bobby Allison, who was driving in relief of his brother Donnie, and Richard Petty charged into the fray; they hit the line three abreast and Waltrip was declared the winner as the final laps ran under caution.
1979: In a race that was seen on ABC's Wide World of Sports, Darrell Waltrip and Richard Petty hooked horns in a memorable duel. The lead changed four times between them on Lap 365 and three times on the final lap; Waltrip prevailed over Petty when he cleared Petty in Turn Three and Donnie Allison tried to shoot the gap, instead getting hung alongside Petty. During the race, David Pearson made a pit stop, and thought the Wood brothers were going to change only two tires. With the lug nuts loosened all the way around, Pearson sped out of the pits after two tires had been replaced. The loose inside wheels flew off near the pit road, ending Pearson's day. A week later, Pearson and the Wood Brothers split, despite scoring 43 wins from 1972 to 1978 with the Virginia-based team.
1980: David Pearson was now driving for Hoss Ellington Racing's #1 car, replacing Donnie Allison for the 1980 season. Despite the fact that the race was plagued by constant rain, and incoming darkness (the track did not have lights installed until the 2004 Southern 500, which finished after darkness), Pearson dominated the race and won after the race was called five laps after it was an official race with 189 complete. However, this would be Pearson's 105th and final Cup Win, and his 10th at Darlington in his storied career.
1981: Darrell Waltrip beat Harry Gant by a car length for his third Rebel 500 win in the event's previous five runnings, while Gant finished second in his debut ride in a #33 Pontiac with car owners Hal Needham and Burt Reynolds.
1982: Dale Earnhardt, driving Bud Moore's #15 Ford, grabbed the first of nine Darlington wins when he led 181 laps but had to hold off a last-lap challenge from Cale Yarborough. Tim Richmond finished a lap down in fifth after a NASCAR penalty on pit road; Richmond was making his debut in Jim Stacy's #2.
1984 Darrell Waltrip led 251 laps as crashes galore thinned out the field.  The crashing began when pole-sitter Benny Parsons hit the second-turn wall on the first lap; later there were back-to-back four-car crashes, and halfway through the race a multicar melee erupted involving Rusty Wallace, Dick Brooks, and D.K. Ulrich where Ulrich climbed another car; some 28 of 38 entries were involved in crashes.
1987: Bill Elliott ran out of fuel on the final lap, and coasted out of turn 4, allowing Dale Earnhardt to sweep by and take the victory.  Two vicious crashes erupted; in one Terry Labonte was injured ion a hard hit by a spinning Ricky Rudd, while later rookie Davey Allison hit a guardrail and his Ford's fuel cell erupted in flame.
1988: Lake Speed escaped a multicar wreck in the opening laps and breezed to one of the sport's most dramatic upset wins.  It was his only Sprint Cup win.
1990: Dale Earnhardt took the win, but the story of the race was a massive accident between Ernie Irvan and Ken Schrader; Irvan was ten laps down yet racing nose-to-nose with Schrader as if for the lead, and lost control in Four; several cars collided in the ensuring melee and Sterling Marlin spun off the wall and hammered Neil Bonnett; Bonnett suffered severe memory loss and was lost for three seasons as a driver.
2003: Before a national television audience, Ricky Craven and Kurt Busch fought a memorable duel that came down to the final turn, when Craven edged out Busch by 0.002 seconds (about 1-2 inches) in the joint closest finish in NASCAR history since NASCAR started using electronic transponders to determine scoring (along with the Aaron's 499 at Talladega in Spring 2011).
2020: The two races, held May 17 and 20, were the first Cup Series events since March 8 (at Phoenix) because of the COVID-19 pandemic that led to a 72-day suspension of motorsport. The race operated under heavy restrictions to follow social distancing guidelines, including being behind closed doors, a team limit of 16, and without practice or qualifying. Kevin Harvick won the race, his second Darlington win and 50th career Cup Series win.

Past winners

Notes
1957: Race postponed due to rain.
1957–62:  Race was for convertibles.
1963:  Two 150-mile race format similar to motocross, best average score wins.  Weatherly won the first race, Richard Petty won the second race.  Weatherly (1/2) won the Rebel 300 with best overall finish.
2020: Two races held on same week due to COVID-19 pandemic. The May 20 event was scheduled for a 500km race.
1980, 1999 & 2020 II: Race shortened due to rain.

Track length notes
1952: 1.25 mile course
1957–1970: 1.375 mile course
1971–present: 1.366 mile course

Multiple winners (drivers)

Multiple winners (teams)

Manufacturer wins

Notes

References

External links

1957 establishments in South Carolina
NASCAR Cup Series races
 
Recurring sporting events established in 1957